Fugues is a magazine with a focus on gay content, which publishes monthly in Montreal, Quebec, Canada, since April 1984. The magazine is primarily written in French, although some English content is also published as well. It focuses on news related to LGBT communities, gay culture, nightlife, health, fitness, fashion, travel, festivals, arts and entertainment. Each issue contains articles on news, trends, culture, nightlife, community activities, special folders, and opinion articles.

Content 
The magazine aims to highlight both popular and under-the-radar events, personalities and products that appeal to LGBT people both local and abroad visiting Montreal (and Quebec Province), through a variety of portals that include a print publication, an interactive website, a digital newsletter, and an extensive social media presence. FUGUES’ informed commentary on a variety of topics—including nightlife, dining, entertainment, politics, community issues, fashion, travel, sports, and celebrity— informs a community and engages an influential and loyal readership.

Fugues writes in order to support and promote the LGBT community. It features a listing of locations in the current Quebec gay scene as well as softcore erotic advertisements and a large directory section, including community group information, business contacts, real estate, ads for health and body care, massage and escort services, counseling services and phone lines. It also features a horoscope column with a love twist, several columns, several features and special sections each month.

Distribution 
Fugues is published as an alternative format (7" X 10,25") glossy magazine and is distributed as a free publication not only in Montreal's Gay Village, but also all over town and in selected cities across Canada such as Quebec City, Ottawa, Toronto, Vancouver and over 20 smaller cities all over the Province of Quebec. It is the only LGBT magazine title in Quebec with a regular print circulation.

Fugues' outreach of over 255,000 monthly readers is maintained through multiple mediums, such as their monthly free publication which reaches a circulation of 39,000+ copies reaching 210,000+ readers, a virtual PDF version of the publication, a daily updated website, weekly E-newsletters, and an active Facebook page.

Each month the magazine offers more than 160 pages of articles on a large diversity of subjects, and several columns written from its main audience's perspective by leading and well-respected journalists, celebrities and community leaders.

Staff
The magazine is published by Éditions Nitram.

Yves Lafontaine is the director/editor in chief. Contributors to the magazine have included André C. Passiour, Michel Joanny-Furtin, Denis-Daniel Boullé, Julie Vaillancourt, Olivier Gagnon, Patrick Brunette, Eric Paquette. Photographers Robert Laliberté, Oscar Ochoa,  Perry Senecal, StudioFotofusion's Dominic Brunet as well as Montreal's high camp drag queen Mado Lamotte, sommelier Olivier de Maisonneuve, local DJ Louis Costa, and Andre Roy (one of Quebec most notable poets and critics) are part of the magazine's panel of contributors.

Other publications by the same publisher

Fugues publishers publish a number of other publications including:
Guide Arc-en-ciel
Quebec Rainbow Guide (English version of Guide Arc-en-ciel)
DecorHomme 
Zip (erotic magazine)

References

External links
 Magazine Fugues
 Guide Arc-en-ciel  (PDF and ISSUU versions)
 Magazine DecorHomme

1980s LGBT literature
1990s LGBT literature
2000s LGBT literature
2010s LGBT literature
1984 establishments in Quebec
French-language magazines published in Canada
Gay men's magazines
LGBT culture in Montreal
LGBT-related magazines published in Canada
Magazines established in 1984
Magazines published in Montreal
Monthly magazines published in Canada
LGBT literature in Canada